Christl is a given name and surname, and may refer to:

Given name
 Christl Cranz (1914–2004), German alpine skier
 Christl Donnelly Professor of Statistical Epidemiology at Imperial College London
 Christl Haas (1943–2001), Austrian alpine skiing champion at the 1964 Winter Olympics
 Christl Hintermaier (born 1946), German alpine skier who competed at the 1968 Winter Olympics
 Christ'l Joris (born 1954), Belgian businesswoman
 Christl Mardayn (1896–1971), Austrian actress and singer
 Christoph Probst (1919–1943), German resistance fighter also known as Christl Probst
 Christl Verduyn (born 1953), Canadian academic
 Christl Ruth Vonholdt (born 1954), German physician and author

Surname
 Lisy Christl (born 1964), German costume designer

See also
 Christ (disambiguation)
 Christel
 Christl Arena, an arena in New York
 Christol
 Christy (disambiguation)

Surnames